Waker-uz-Zaman (born 16 September 1966) is a lieutenant general of the Bangladesh Army and principal staff officer of the Prime Minister's Office, Armed Forces Division.

Early life and education 
Zaman graduated from Defence Services Command and Staff College. He studied at the Joint Services Command and Staff College in the United Kingdom. He holds a master's degree in defence studies from Bangladesh and a Master of Arts in defence studies from King's College, University of London.

Career 
Zaman received his commission in 1985 from Bangladesh Military Academy with 13th BMA Long Course at the East Bengal Regiment of Bangladesh Army. Zaman taught at the Non-Commissioned Officer's Academy, School of Infantry and Tactics and Bangladesh Institute of Peace Support Operation Training. He served in the United Nations Mission in Liberia and United Nations Angola Verification Mission I. He served as Deputy Assistant Military Secretary, Assistant Military Secretary & Deputy Military Secretary in Military Secretary's Branch, Army Headquarters. He served in Army Security Unit & Commanded the 17th East Bengal Regiment. He commanded the 46th Independent Infantry Brigade in Dhaka. Zaman was appointed as Military Secretary of Bangladesh Army in Army Headquarters twice in 2013 and 2017 subsequently. After that he was appointed at 9th Infantry Division as General Officer Commanding (GOC) and Area Commander of Savar Area. On 30 November 2020, Zaman was promoted to Lieutenant General and appointed Principal Staff Officer of Armed Forces Division. He is the current chairperson of Bangladesh National Authority for Chemical Weapons Convention. He is a member of the governing body of the National Defence College.

Personal life 
Zaman is married to Begum Sarahnaz Kamalika Zaman and the couple have two daughters. He is the son-in-law of late General Mustafizur Rahman, who served as the army chief from 24 December 1997, to 23 December 2000.

References 

Living people
Bangladesh Army generals
Principal Staff Officers (Bangladesh)
1966 births
National Defence College (Bangladesh) alumni